A Night in San Francisco is a live album by Northern Irish singer-songwriter Van Morrison, released in 1994. Guest artists were Candy Dulfer, John Lee Hooker, Junior Wells and Jimmy Witherspoon as well as Morrison's daughter, Shana Morrison. James Hunter and Brian Kennedy helped out with the vocals and Georgie Fame was also present.

The June 2008 reissued and remastered version of the album contains a live take of the Morrison song "Cleaning Windows". "I'll Take Care of You/It's a Man's Man's Man's World" from this album was listed as one of the standout tracks from a set of six reissued Van Morrison albums (on Universal Music).

Recording
The album is compiled of live performances at the Masonic Auditorium, San Francisco, California on 18 December 1993 and the Mystic Theater, Petaluma, California, on 12 December 1993. The bonus track "Cleaning Windows/The Street Only Knew Your Name" was recorded on 17 December 1993 at the Masonic Auditorium San Francisco, California.

Composition
"In the Garden/You Send Me/Allegheny" was nominated for Best Male Rock Vocal Performance in the 37th Annual Grammy Awards. Most of the songs were medleys with several vocalists performing on each.

Reception

Richard Williams of The Independent wrote in his review that: "A Night in San Francisco...goes for the heart of the stuff that first inspired Morrison: rhythm and blues. He is in electrifyingly authoritative form, bringing all his experience to some of his finest songs."

Track listing
All songs written by Van Morrison unless noted.

Disc one
"Did Ye Get Healed?" – 4:18
"It's All in the Game/Make It Real One More Time" (Charles Dawes, Carl Sigman)/(Morrison) – 4:19
"I've Been Working" – 3:24
"I Forgot That Love Existed" (Morrison) – 6:17
"Vanlose Stairway/Trans-Euro Train/A Fool for You" (Morrison)/(Morrison)/(Ray Charles) – 6:55
"You Make Me Feel So Free" – 3:14
"Beautiful Vision" – 4:11
"See Me Through/Soldier of Fortune/Thank You" (Morrison)/(Morrison)/(Sylvester Stewart) – 10:18
"Ain't That Loving You Baby?" (Ivory Joe Hunter, Clyde Otis) – 4:44
"Stormy Monday/Have You Ever Loved a Woman?/No Rollin' Blues" (T-Bone Walker)/(Billy Myles)/(Jimmy Witherspoon) – 6:08
"Help Me" (Sonny Boy Williamson II) – 6:10
Organ solo from "Green Onions" (Booker T. Jones, Steve Cropper, Lewie Steinberg, Al Jackson Jr.)
"Good Morning Little Schoolgirl" (Sonny Boy Williamson I) – 3:33
"Tupelo Honey" – 4:01
"Moondance/My Funny Valentine" (Morrison)/(Richard Rodgers, Lorenz Hart) – 9:09

Disc two
"Jumpin' With Symphony Sid" (King Pleasure, Lester Young) – 4:47
"It Fills You Up" – 4:43
"I'll Take Care of You"/It's a Man's Man's Man's World" (Brook Benton) / (James Brown, Betty Newsome) – 16:23
"Lonely Avenue/Be-Bop-A-Lula/4 O'Clock in the Morning (Try for Sleep)/Family Affair/You Give Me Nothing but the Blues/When Will I Become A Man?/Sooner Or Later/Down the Line" (Doc Pomus) / (Gene Vincent, Bill Davis) / (Morrison, John Platania) / (Sylvester Stewart) / (Morrison) / (Erica Ehm, Tim Thorney) / (Vernon, Ross, Shaw) / (Roy Orbison) – 14:51
"So Quiet in Here/That's Where It's At" (Morrison) / (James Alexander, Sam Cooke) – 5:00
"In the Garden/Real Real Gone/Allegheny/You Send Me" (Morrison) / (Morrison) / (trad.) / (Sam Cooke) – 9:41
"Have I Told You Lately" – 3:51
"Shakin' All Over/Gloria" (Johnny Kidd) / (Morrison) – 11:29

Bonus track (2008 CD reissue)
"Cleaning Windows" – 3:46

Personnel

Van Morrison – vocals, guitar, alto saxophone, harmonica
Haji Ahkba – flugelhorn, background vocals
Geoff Dunn – drums
Georgie Fame – vocals, organ, background vocals
Ronnie Johnson – guitar
Teena Lyle – vibraphone, percussion, recorder, background vocals
Jonn Savannah – vocals, piano, background vocals
Nicky Scott – bass guitar, background vocals
Kate St John – soprano and tenor saxophones, oboe

With
James Hunter – vocals, guitar, background vocals
Brian Kennedy – vocals, background vocals

Special guests
Candy Dulfer – alto saxophone, background vocals
John Lee Hooker – vocals on "Gloria"
Shana Morrison – vocals on "Beautiful Vision"
Junior Wells – vocals, harmonica on "Help Me" and "Good Morning Little School Girl"
Jimmy Witherspoon – vocals on "Have You Ever Loved a Woman?", "No Rollin' Blues", "When Will I Become a Man?" and "Sooner Or Later"

Charts
Album – Billboard (North America)

Album – UK Albums Chart (United Kingdom)

Notes

External links
Krbechek's Metronews Music Reviews: A Night in San Francisco

Albums produced by Van Morrison
Van Morrison live albums
1994 live albums
Mercury Records live albums
Polydor Records live albums